Solar energy is widely available in Armenia due to its geographical position and is considered a developing industry.

According to the Ministry of Energy Infrastructures and Natural Resources of Armenia, Armenia has an average of about 1720 kilowatt hour (kWh) solar energy flow per square meter of horizontal surface annually and has a potential of 1000 MW power production. In the capital Yerevan, the average solar energy flux is equal to 1642 kWh/m2. Armenia's area cannot be considered as homogeneous from the perspective of available solar energy: the difference between the amount of solar energy reaching the ground in different places in the country can be up to 20% in the summer time, and 50% in the winter time.

The use of solar energy in Armenia is gradually increasing. In 2019, the European Union announced plans to assist Armenia towards developing its solar power capacity. The initiative has supported the construction of a power plant with 4,000 solar panels located in Gladzor.

Photovoltaics 

Currently 9 solar PV plants (total installed capacity – about 7,02 MW) have been put into operation. 7 companies (totally 31,5 MW) have been licensed for the construction of the solar PV plant with up tp 5 MW installed capacity.

As of February 20, 2019, technical terms were given to 907 autonomous energy producers with capacity up to 500 kW (total capacity 12,9 MW), 854 of which have already been connected to energy system (total capacity 10,3 MW). Example of buildings equipped with solar panels are the American University of Armenia generating enough power for the elevators and other uses, and the UN House in Armenia.

A 55 MW utility-scale solar power plant will be built near Mets Masrik in Gegharkunik province, requiring an investment of about $50 million. International tender was won by consortium of the Netherlands’ Fotowatio Renewable Ventures (FRV) B.V and Spain’s FSL Solar S.L. that are expected to commission the plant in 2020.

There are defined tariffs for generating electricity using solar energy. In November 2016, Public Services Regulatory Commission of RA made a decision to set the price of electrical energy from photovoltaic systems to 42.645 AMD/kWh.

Consumers are allowed to install solar panels with total power of up to 150 kW, and may sell any surplus to electricity distribution company Electric Networks of Armenia (ENA).

Thermal solar 

In Armenia, solar thermal collectors, or water-heaters, are produced in standard sizes (1.38-4.12 square meters). Solar water-heaters can be used for space heating, solar cooling, etc. In order to generate heat, they use solar energy from the Sun. Modern solar water֊heaters can cause water to boil even in winter․

Solar thermal collectors are used throughout the territory of Armenia. One building using solar thermal collectors is AUA, which uses solar cooling and ventilation systems. The biggest solar water-heater in Armenia is located at Diana hotel in Goris, which has 1900 vacuum tubes that provide hot water for a swimming pool with 180 cubic meter volume, and for 40 hotel rooms.

Solar companies 
The main companies that operate in this sector in Armenia are SolarOn (local PV panel manufacturer), Solar Group Ltd, Arpi Solar Ltd, Simartek (in partnership with Solitek Armenia), Eco Step Armenia, ArtClima, General Electric Lighting Armenia (Rubinar LLC), Elips Technoline, Hatuk Santekhmontazh CJSC (SanHit Specialized Shop), Shtigen, Technoeco,  and SOLARA (local PV panel manufacturer, in partnership with LA Solar Group).

Obstacles 
One of the main factors preventing the development of solar energy in Armenia is the installation cost.

See also 

Energy in Armenia
Electricity sector in Armenia
List of cities by sunshine duration
Renewable energy
Renewable energy in Armenia
Renewable energy by country

References

External links
Ministry of Energy Infrastructures and Natural Resources of Armenia
Public Services Regulatory Commission of Armenia
Armenia Renewable Resources and Energy Efficiency Fund
Solar water heater suppliers, Spyur Information System
Solar energy suppliers, Spyur Information System
Էկովիլ արևային տեխնոլոգիաներ 

Electric power in Armenia
Energy in Armenia
Renewable energy
Renewable energy in Armenia
 
Armenia
Power